The Zuhr prayer ("noon prayer") is one of the five mandatory salah (Islamic prayer). As an Islamic day starts at sunset, the Zuhr prayer is technically the fourth prayer of the day. If counted from midnight, it is the second prayer of the day.

It contains four units (rakaʿāt) and begins after the sun reaches its zenith.

On Friday, the Zuhr prayer is replaced or preceded by Friday prayer which is obligatory for Muslim men who are above the age of puberty and meet certain requirements to pray in congregation either in a mosque or with a group of Muslims.

The khutbah is given by the imam.

It is also transliterated Dhuhr, Duhr, Thuhr or Luhar.

The five daily prayers collectively are one pillar of the Five Pillars of Islam, in Sunni Islam, and one of the ten Ancillaries of the Faith (Furū al-Dīn) according to Shia Islam.

Name variations

See also
Wudu
Other salah:
Fajr prayer (Morning)
Asr prayer (Afternoon)
Maghrib prayer (Sunset) 
Isha prayer (Night)
Friday prayer
Eid prayers
 Mandaean prayer at noontime

References

Salah
Salah terminology